Jari Juha Tolsa (born April 20, 1981) is a Swedish professional ice hockey left winger who plays for Varberg Vipers in the Swedish Division 2.

Career statistics

Regular season and playoffs

External links

1981 births
Detroit Red Wings draft picks
Espoo Blues players
Frölunda HC players
Living people
Modo Hockey players
Swedish people of Finnish descent
Swedish ice hockey left wingers
Ice hockey people from Gothenburg